The PT Mi-P is a large Czechoslovakian anti-tank mine. The mine is a large hemisphere, with a carrying handle and an RO-9 attachment for a tilt rod on one side. It uses a large shaped charge warhead that uses a five millimeter thick steel liner, and can penetrate up to 150 millimeters of armour. The mine was in service with the armies of the Czech Republic and Slovakia, but is now obsolete.

Specifications
 Height: 238 mm
 Diameter: 266 mm
 Length of tilt rod: 500 mm (adjustable)
 Weight: 10 kg
 Explosive content: 5.8 kg of TNT
 Operating pressure: 5 kg tilt.

References
 Jane's Mines and Mine Clearance 2005-2006
 

Anti-tank mines
Land mines of Czechoslovakia